WBAG may refer to:

 WBAG (AM), a radio station (1150 AM) licensed to Burlington, North Carolina, United States
 WNCB, a radio station (93.9 FM) licensed to Cary, North Carolina, United States and formerly called WBAG-FM
 Wiener Börse, the Vienna Stock Exchange